I. L. Caragiale is a commune in Dâmbovița County, Muntenia Romania. It was first attested in 1482/1495.  Known as Haimanale (hooligans) until 1952, it is the birthplace of the well known playwright Ion Luca Caragiale. The commune is composed of three villages: Ghirdoveni (the commune center), I. L. Caragiale and Mija.

References

Communes in Dâmbovița County
Localities in Muntenia

ro:I.L. Caragiale, Dâmbovița